Paul Verhoeven (23 June 1901 – 22 March 1975) was a German actor as well as a film and theatre director.

Early life
Verhoeven was born in the town of Unna. He had 13 siblings. The family lived in modest circumstances.

Career
He directed and acted in over 50 films. He wrote over 20 film scripts, the first of which was Das kleine Hofkonzert in 1935, an operetta with music by Edmund Nick based on a comedy by Verhoeven and Toni Impekoven.

From 1945 to 1948 he was artistic director at the Residenz Theatre/Staatsschauspiel in Munich.

Personal life and demise
Verhoeven was married to the actress Doris Kiesow, with whom he had three children: Lis Verhoeven, who became an actress and was the first wife of Mario Adorf; Michael Verhoeven, who became a film director and married Senta Berger; and Monika Verhoeven.

From his relationship with the actress Edith Schultze-Westrum, he had a son, Thomas Schultze-Westrum, who became a zoologist and maker of animal documentaries.

Paul Verhoeven died on stage of a heart attack in 1975 while delivering the eulogy for the recently deceased actress Therese Giehse at the Munich Kammerspiele. He was buried in the Munich Waldfriedhof next to his wife.

Selected filmography

Actor
 1936: Der Kaiser von Kalifornien (dir. Luis Trenker), as Barmixer Billy 
 1938: The Stars Shine (dir. Hans H. Zerlett), as Gebauer
 1940: The Three Codonas (dir. Arthur Maria Rabenalt), as Juwelen-Max
 1959: People in the Net (dir. Franz Peter Wirth), as Karel
 1961: Hamlet (dir. Franz Peter Wirth, TV film), as Gravedigger
 1965:  (dir. Peter Beauvais, TV film), as Bernhard Lichtenberg
 1967: The Dance of Death (dir. Michael Verhoeven), as Edgar
 1968:  (dir. Peter Beauvais, TV miniseries, based on Francis Durbridge), as Samuel Fielding
 1968:  (dir. Wolfgang Becker, TV miniseries), as Körner
 1969:  (dir. Peter Beauvais, TV film), as Harro Hassenreuter, former theatrical manager
 1973:  (dir. Franz Peter Wirth), as Monsignore Berghammer

Director
Film

 1937: 
 1938: Der Tag nach der Scheidung
 1938: Unsere kleine Frau (German-language version)
 1938: Mia moglie si diverte (Italian-language version)
 1939: Salonwagen E 417
 1939: Renate in the Quartet
 1939: Gold in New Frisco
 1940: Aus erster Ehe
 1942: Die Nacht in Venedig
 1942: The Rainer Case
 1942: Der große Schatten
 1943: Ein glücklicher Mensch
 1944: Das Konzert
 1944: Philharmoniker
 1948: The Court Concert
 1949: Du bist nicht allein
 1950: This Man Belongs to Me
 1950: Heart of Stone
 1951: Eva im Frack
 1951: The Guilt of Doctor Homma
 1951: A Heidelberg Romance
 1952: A Very Big Child
 1952: That Can Happen to Anyone
 1953: 
 1953: Don't Forget Love
 1953: Wedding in Transit
 1954: A Woman of Today
 1954: Hoheit lassen bitten
 1954: The Eternal Waltz
 1955: I Know What I'm Living For
 1955: Roman einer Siebzehnjährigen
 1956: The Golden Bridge
 1956: Like Once Lili Marleen
 1957: Jede Nacht in einem anderen Bett
 1957: Von allen geliebt
 1960: The Juvenile Judge 
 1962: Her Most Beautiful Day

Television
 1957: Die Abenteuer des braven Soldaten Schwejk — (based on The Good Soldier Švejk by Jaroslav Hašek)
 1957: Der geheimnisvolle Dr. Mander — (based on a radio play by Michael Brett)
 1957: Die Fee — (based on The Good Fairy by Ferenc Molnár)
 1958: Die letzte Station — (based on a play by Erich Maria Remarque)
 1958: Die selige Edwina Black — (based on the play The Late Edwina Black by William Dinner and William Morum)
 1958: Dr. med. Hiob Praetorius — (based on a play by Curt Goetz)
 1959: Die Troerinnen des Euripides — (based on The Trojan Women)
 1959: Nachtasyl — (based on the play The Lower Depths by Maxim Gorky)
 1960: Der Fehltritt — (based on a play by Glen Bohannan and Andrew Solt)
 1960: Die große Wut des Philipp Hotz — (based on a play by Max Frisch)
 1960: Das Lied der Taube — (based on the play The Voice of the Turtle by John Van Druten)
 1961: Froher Herbst des Lebens — (based on the play Alice Sit-by-the-Fire by J. M. Barrie)
 1961: Die Sache mit dem Ring — (based on the play The Ring of Truth by Wynyard Browne)
 1962: Seit Adam und Eva — (based on the play Ever Since Paradise by J. B. Priestley)
 1962: Bedaure, falsch verbunden — (based on the radio play Sorry, Wrong Number by Lucille Fletcher)
 1962: Peter Pan — (based on Peter Pan by J. M. Barrie)
 1963: Mamselle Nitouche — (based on the operetta Mam'zelle Nitouche)
 1963: Kleider machen Leute — (based on a novella by Gottfried Keller)
 1963: Geliebt in Rom
 1964: Frau Warrens Gewerbe — (based on Mrs. Warren's Profession by George Bernard Shaw)
 1964: Zweierlei Maß — (based on Shakespeare's Measure for Measure)
 1965: Vor Nachbarn wird gewarnt — (based on the play Meet a Body by Frank Launder and Sidney Gilliat)
 1966: Der Fall Jeanne d'Arc
 1966: Der Fall Mata Hari
 1967: Liebe für Liebe (co-director: Hans Schweikart) — (based on Love for Love by William Congreve)
 1967: Der Panamaskandal
 1967: Gottes zweite Garnitur — (based on a novel by Willi Heinrich)
 1971: Der Hitler/Ludendorff-Prozeß – Szenen aus einem Hochverratsprozeß in einer Republik ohne Republikaner
 1972: Verdacht gegen Barry Croft — (based on a play by Scott Forbes)

Screenwriter
 1936: The Court Concert (dir. Douglas Sirk)

References

 Die Verhoevens, 2003 (documentary film by Felix Moeller, Germany; 75 minutes)

External links

1901 births
1975 deaths
20th-century German male actors
People from Unna
Mass media people from North Rhine-Westphalia
German male film actors
German male television actors